Michael Berk is an American television screenwriter. He worked with Douglas Schwartz as a writer on the television series Manimal, and many made-for-television movies. He wrote the earlier scripts of the series Baywatch, and is also known as the creator, co-producer, and writer of the television series The Wizard.

Screenwriting credits

Television
Manimal (1983)
The Wizard (1986– 1987)
Baywatch (1989–1998)
Thunder in Paradise (1994)
Baywatch Nights (1995)

Film
The Peace Killers (1971)
The Incredible Journey of Doctor Meg Laurel (1979)
The Last Song (1980)
The Ordeal of Dr. Mudd (1980)
The Wild and the Free (1980)
The Haunting Passion (1983)
Crime of Innocence (1985)
Baywatch: Panic at Malibu Pier (1989)
Assault on Devil’s Island (1997)
Steel Chariots (1997)
Shadow Warriors II: Hunt for the Death Merchant (1999)
Baywatch: Hawaiian Wedding (2003)
Soul Surfer (2011)
SPF-18 (2017)

Co-creator
The Wizard (1986–1987)
Baywatch (1989–2001)
Thunder in Paradise (1994)
Baywatch Nights (1995–1997)

Producer

Television
Manimal (1983)
The Wizard (1986–1987)
Baywatch (1989–1999)
Thunder in Paradise (1994)
Baywatch Nights (1995)

Film
The Peace Killers (1970)
The Ordeal of Dr. Mudd (1980)
The Wild and the Free (1980)
The Haunting Passion (1983)
Crime of Innocence (1985)
Baywatch: Panic at Malibu Pier (1989)
Steel Chariots (1997)
Assault on Devil’s Island (1997)
Baywatch: Hawaiian Wedding (2003)
Soul Surfer (2011)
Baywatch (2017)

External links

The Wizard Official Fansite & Definitive Cyberhome – The Michael Berk Collection

American male television writers
American television writers
Living people
Year of birth missing (living people)